US Naval Advance Bases were built globally by the United States Navy during World War II to support and project U.S. naval operations worldwide.  A few were built on Allied soil, but most were captured enemy facilities or completely new.  Advance bases provided the fleet with support to keep ships tactically available with repair and supply depots of facilities, rather than return them to the continental United States. Before Japan declared war on the United States the U.S. Navy had a single fleet-sized advanced base in the Territory of Hawaii at Naval Station Pearl Harbor.  During the war the U.S. Navy Seabees built over 400 advance bases categorized by size.  Naval bases were either Lions or Cubs while airfields were either Oaks or Acorns.  Lions and Oaks were major facilities while Cubs and Acorns were minor. PT Boats typically would get a Cub and airfields with single runways were Acorns.  The larger bases could do refueling and overhaul; loading of troopship and cargo ships; and preparing amphibious assault ships. Some became major repair depots. The Seabees developed auxiliary floating drydocks were able to repair battle damage and do regular maintenance in the field saving ships trans-pacific trips for repair. A few bases also were developed to be R and R for all U.S. personnel. Most Advance Bases were built by the US Navy's Seabees in Naval Construction Battalions (CBs). At the start of the war civilian contractors were employed in construction. The Seabees in World War II built most of the airfields used by the United States Army Air Forces and United States Marine Corps, as they had the ships and cranes needed to transport the vast amount of equipment needed at the advance bases. The US Army and United States Coast Guard also operated out of many of these facilities. Seabees could build new or repair damaged runways, and with advancements in heavy bomber technology lengthen runways as needed. A few Naval Advance Bases were built for the Korean War and Vietnam War.

Advance Bases
Built at the bases were personnel housing, piers, roads, shops, power plants, water plants. Large storage depots with fuel, ammunition, food, and other consumable supplies. Fuel for ships, airplanes and vehicles was in much demand, 25,000,000 barrels of fuel was shipped to Pacific bases in just June 1945. During World War 2, in Guam alone one million gallons of aviation gasoline were needed each day. Over 325,000 Seabees troops built bases. The many bases were needed for the logistics needs of the troops around the world. On the home front many new ships and boats were built the West coast and East coast, Great Lakes and the Gulf of Mexico. Under the Emergency Shipbuilding Program and War Shipping Administration contracts went out to shipyards and Ironwork works companies across the country. Ports were needed for many new cargo ships to dock, like the: 2,710 Liberty ships and 531 Victory ships built, plus the many new tankers and new warships. In the South Pacific, Seabees operated coral pit mines, as crushed coral was used for runways, roads, sidewalks, and more. Many runways were built using steel Marston Mats. At some bases Seabees built sawmills, to produce local timber. Floating pile drivers were used to built piers, docks, and wharves. If pile driving was not suitable, a floating wharf was built. To protect ships and the ports, they needed to built and repaired quickly and runways. Sometimes Seabees set up electric generator lighting and worked around the clock to complete runways. For housing, offices, mess halls, and depots a vast amount of quonset huts of different sizes were built. The Pacific island hopping campaigns, gave new work to be done each day.

At the end of World War 2, almost all of the bases were closed, many were abandoned. A vast amount of vehicles, supplies and equipment at the bases was deemed not needed and too costly to ship to the U.S. Bring the gear home also would have hurt home front industries, as there was already a vast amount of military surplus. Much the equipment was destroyed. Some was given to the local governments as a thank you for the land use. Some of the abandoned bases were used for local military, some turned into towns and ports, like Naval Advance Base Espiritu Santo. Some of the abandoned airfields turned into local and international airports, a post-war Seabees legacy.

 On the George Washington Memorial Parkway is the Seabees Memorial near the entrance of Arlington National Cemetery.

The need for advance bases during World War II was so great, that in some cases some Pacific Ocean islands were too small for the demand. So in 1943, the US Navy created Service Squadrons. A Service Squadron was a small fleet of ships that acted as an advance base. A service squadron would have: tankers, Fleet oilers,  Troopship-barracks ships, refrigerator  ships, ammunition ships, supply ships, floating docks, different kinds of barges and repair ships. They provided diesel, ordnance, aviation fuel, food stuffs, and all other supplies.

Active Bases
 Naval Base Guam, (Battle of Guam), opened 1944
 Naval Undersea Warfare Center, Detachment AUTEC, Bahamas, opened 1958
 Naval Support Activity Bahrain, opened 1941
 Naval Support Facility Diego Garcia, British Indian Ocean Territory, opened 1971
 Guantanamo Bay Naval Base, Cuba, opened 1898
 Camp Lemonnier, Djibouti,  opened 2002
 Naval Support Activity Souda Bay, Souda Bay, Crete,  opened 1951
 Naval Air Station Sigonella, Italy, 1957
 Naval Support Activity Naples, Italy, 1951
Naval Computer and Telecommunications Station Naples, Italy, Italy, opened 1963
 Naval Air Facility Atsugi, Japan, opened 1938
 Naval Forces Japan, Okinawa, Japan, 1945 (Naval Facility Okinawa`)
 United States Fleet Activities Yokosuka, Japan, opened 1870
 United States Fleet Activities Sasebo, Japan,  opened 1883
 Misawa Air Base, Japan,  opened 1945 
  Camp Patriot at the Kuwait Naval Base (Gulf War), opened 2003
 Port of Duqm, Masirah, and Port of Salalah Oman, opened 1980
 Naval Medical Research Unit Six, Peru, opened 1983
 Commander Fleet Activities Chinhae, South Korea, opened 1946
 Naval Station Rota Spain, opened 1953
 Fujairah Naval Base, Port of Fujairah, Base at Fujairah International Airport, United Arab Emirates (Operation Earnest Will), opened 1987
 Jebel Ali Port Facility in United Arab Emirates Port, port use, no base, opened 1979.
 US Navy operates out of Marine Corps Air Station Iwakuni, Japan  opened 1950

Closed bases

Major Advance Bases 

 Naval Advance Base Espiritu Santo at Espiritu Santo was the first large advance base built in the Pacific. Closed 1946
Majuro Submarine Base at Majuro Atoll - Harbor, Sub base, Fleet recreational center, two airfileds (1940-1945)
 Manus Naval Base in the Admiralty Islands - Lombrum Naval Base - Seeadler Harbor (1943-1947)
 Naval Advance Base Saipan, included East Field (Saipan), Aslito Field and Marpi Point Field, seaplane base, hospital, depot (Battle of Saipan) 	
 Naval Base Perth  	 
 Naval Base Trinidad, operated off and on shore, part became Carlsen Air Force Base
Naval Base Brisbane, Australia 	  	   	 
  Tinian Naval Base, on Tinian including North Field, West Field, closed in 1947 (Battle of Tinian) 	  	 
 Naval Air Station Bermuda closed 1995  	 
 U.S. Naval Base Subic Bay (Olongapo Naval Station) closed 1992, now Subic Special Economic and Freeport Zone
 Leyte-Samar Naval Base (1944-1947)
 Naval Base Fiji (1942-1945)
 Naval Base Noumea at Nouméa, New Caledonia, major staging base (1942-1956) 	 
 Naval Base Eniwetok at Enewetak Atoll base, including Eniwetok Airfield, seaplane base Parry Island, recreational center   	  	 
 Naval Base Ulithi, Western Carolines, Major anchoring, 3,500-foot runway, seaplane base, recreational center, Hospital on Sorlen Island. Closed in 1945 	  	  	 
 Naval Base Peleliu, at Peleliu 	  	  	 
 Naval Base Iwo Jima at Iwo Jima  
 Naval Base Okinawa, PT Boat base, seaplane base, hospital, depot, repair depot airfields	  	 
 Naval Station Sangley Point in the Philippine closed 1971
 Naval Base Milne Bay at Milne Bay - seaplane base, PT Boats, depot - ship repair - hospital - amphibious training center
 Naval Air Facility Midway Island  (Battle of Midway)
 Wake Island Airfield (Battle of Wake Island)
 Naval Air Station Keflavik, Iceland
 Naval Station Argentia in Newfoundland, closed 1994
 Naval Air Station Bermuda Annex
 Mulberry harbour, Normandy Operation Overlord, Navy built harbour

Rear Pacific Area

Naval Base Panama Canal Zone
United States Naval Station Tutuila, Samoa - depot, repair (1921-1951)
Naval Base Upolu at Upolu Island, Samoa - Advanced Base (1942-1944)
Palmyra Island Palmyra Island Naval Air Station - Advanced Base (1939-1947)
Naval Base Funafuti , Funafuti, Ellice Islands - Advanced base - Air Base, anchorage and small hospital 
 Nanumea - Nanumea Airfield closed 1945
 Nukufetau - Nukufetau Airfield closed 1945
 Canton Island port and Airfield closed 1945
 Naval Base Johnston Atoll on Johnston Atoll, refueling station support of airbase
Sand Island seaplane base on Johnston Atoll
Naval Base Baker Island on Baker Island to support Baker Island Airfield
Howland Island seaplane base
Naval base Kingman Reef
Christmas Island, Kiribati, refuelling and weather station, Cassidy Airfield
Naval Base Hawaii
Naval Air Station Barbers Point and Submarine base Barbers Point
Marine Corps Air Station Kaneohe Bay US Navy base 1939 to 1949
Amphibious Training Base Kamaole, Maui

Philippines

Leyte-Samar Naval Base 
Calicoan, Samar, port, depot, motor pool, recreational center
Manicani Island, Samar  Large Advanced Base, PT boats, depot, sawmill, ship repair, large floating docks ABSD, hospital. 
Naval Base Cavite, Luzon - Main Base, hospital, submarine base, Closed 1971
Naval Station Sangley Point, Sangley Point, seaplane base, 5,000-foot runway
Naval Base Manila in Manila,  hospital, seaplane base, Depot, HQ 7th Fleet, sub base
Liloan, Panaon Island - Advanced Base 
Ormoc, Leyte - Advanced Base 
Naval Base Lingayen - Advanced Base 6  PT Boat, anchorage
Bobon Point, Samar - 5,000-foot and 7,000-foot runway, Port HQ, PT Boat base
 NAS Guiuan at Guiuan, Samar, 7,000-foot runway, bombers, (now Guiuan Airport)
Botic Island, PT boat base
Salcedo, PT boat base 
Naval Base Puerto Princesa, Palawan - Advanced Base - fleet air wing, carrier aircraft service units, bomber squadrons, seaplane base 
Zamboanga City, Basilan Island, Mindanao - Advanced Base, Airfield, PT Boats, repair Zamboanga Peninsula
Mangarin Bay, Mindoro - Advance Base, Airfield, PT Boats
Basilan Island,  Mindanao, PT Boats
Iloilo City, Panay - Advanced Base, PT Boat, depot, repair 
Malamaui Island - Advanced Base 
 Polloc Harbor - Advanced Base 
Sarangani Bay - Advanced Base 
Malalag Bay - Advanced Base 
Santiago Cove - Fueling Stop
Cebu, PT Boat base  (Battle for Cebu City
Mactan, depot, repair, seaplane base, airfield 
Kabayana Naval Base
Naval Air Station Cubi Point in the Philippines, used to support the Korean War, (1951-1992)

Solomon Islands

Tulagi - Bases, PT boat  (Battle of Tulagi and Gavutu–Tanambogo) (1943-1946)
Rendova Island- Base, PT boat
Lever Harbor, New Georgia - Advanced Base, PT boat  (1935-1944) 
Vella Lavella - Advanced Base, PT boat at Lambu Lambu Cove(Battle of Vella Lavella (naval)) Support Barakoma Airfield
Naval Base Treasury Islands, Treasury Islands - Base, PT boat 
Cape Torokina, Bougainville Island - Base, runway built, PT boat (1943-1945)
Green Islands - Base, PT boat
Naval Base Emirau Homestead Lagoon, Emirau Island, Hamburg Bay  - Base -  PT Boats, minor repair base, depots, 3 hospitals, sawmill, two 7,000 feet runways: Inshore and North Cape(1944-1945 )
Henderson Field (Guadalcanal), - Base (Guadalcanal campaign) 
Savo Island - Base (Battle of Savo Island)
Munda Point Airfield, Naval Airbase
Segi Point Airfield, Naval Airbase
Munda Point Airfield, Naval Airbase 
Ondonga Airfield Seaplane base, Naval Airbase
Naval Base Banika Island Advance Base (1943-1945)
Guadalcanal  Advance Base (1943-1946)
Roi Island Advance Base (1946)
Kukum Field, for USAAF and RNZA
Graciosa Bay Seaplane Base Santa Cruz Islands VP-23

Central Pacific

Naval Base Tarawa, Tarawa, in the Gilbert Islands, runway, depot, Marine camp, hospital
Apamama Gilberts, airbase, 6,000-foot runway, naval harbor, closed 1944 (Battle of Abemama)
Makin Island Gilbert Islands
Enewetak Atoll base
Peleliu Naval Base on Palau Islands, Caroline Islands, captured Japanese base, three runways, depot, hospital (Battle of Peleliu)
 Naval Base Kwajalein, Kwajalein Atoll, Marshall Islands, 5,000-foot runway, hospital, 4,300-foot runway, 100-ton dry dock, Roi Islands, Ebadon Island, Namur Island, Ebeye Island (1943-1952) (Battle of Kwajalein)
Majuro Submarine Base, Marshall Islands- Advanced Base, Harbor, Sub base, Fleet recreational center, (1940-1945)
 Naval Base at  Jaluit Atoll, FPO#3000 
Minami-Tori-shima, Surrendered base
Chuuk Lagoon (Truk Atoll), Naval port (1945-1947) (Operation Hailstone)
Weno (Moen)  Airfield, port, Naval Air Facilities (1943-1947)
 Orote, Guam, Mariana Islands, Naval Air Station, (1945-1949)
 Naval Air Station Agana, Agana Guam, Naval Air Station, (1944-1995) 
 Kagman Point, Saipan, Northern Mariana Islands, Naval Air Station (1944-1947)
Canton Island, Phoenix Islands, Naval Air Station (1943-1946)
Tanapag, Saipan, Northern Mariana Islands, Naval Air Station (1946-1950)
 Naval Base Fiji at Suva, Fiji Islands, Major Advance Base (1942-1944)
 Bikini Atoll, Seaport (Battle of Kwajalein), then Operation Crossroads test

Caroline Islands

Naval Base Ulithi on Ulithi Atoll, FPO# 3011
Naval base Angaur Island, on Palau Islands, base to support Angaur Airstrip
 Naval Base at  Uman Island, Truk Lagoon, FPO#3048, 4th Fleet anchorage, PT Boat Base.<ref>Uman Island'pacificwrecks.com</ref>
 Naval Base Kossol Roads, FPO#3027, Fleet anchorage, staging area to support operations in the Philippines.
 Naval Base at  Puluwat Island, Truk Lagoon, FPO#3044
 Naval Base at  Fefan Island, Truk Lagoon, FPO#3045, captured seaport 
 Naval Base at  Yap Island, FPO#3014, captured base
 Naval Base at  Param Island, Truk Lagoon, FPO#3050,  post war taked Airfield
 Naval Base at  Tol Island, Truk, FPO#3105, post war taked base
 Naval Base at  Sorol Island, FPO#3012, post war small base 
 Naval Base at  Namonuito Atoll, FPO#3037
 Naval Base at  Minto Reef, FPO#3038
 Naval Base at  Pulap Island, FPO#3039
 Naval Base at  Pakin Island, Senyavin IslandsFPO#3064
 Naval Base at  Ant Island, in Senyavin Islands, FPO#3067
 Naval Base at  Oroluk Atoll, FPO#3075, Oroluk Island had a lookout tower and Oroluk Lagoon for anchorage. 
 Naval Base at  Ngulu Atoll, FPO#3079
 Naval Base at  Namolus Island, FPO#3081
 Naval Base at  Tonelik Island, FPO#3082, post war small base  
 Naval Base at  Woleai Island, FPO#3246, post war, Woleai airfield.
 Naval Base at  Hall Islands, FPO#3061, located to the north of Truk Lagoon.

Australia, Papua New Guinea & Dutch New Guinea

Australia:
Naval Base Brisbane, Australia, Sub Base, repair depot, Camp Seabee
Naval Base Sydney in Sydney, Australia hospital, repair and depot
Naval Base Melbourne at Port of Melbourne Australia, depot, HQ till July 1942
Naval Air Station Palm Island, Australia
Townsville Naval Section Base, Australia
Horn Island Seaplane Base, Australia
Naval Base Cairns at Cairns, Australia - Base - Hospital, PT Boats, Depot, 40-ton floating drydock 
Naval Base Darwin, Darwin, Australia - Base -mine depot and PT Boats
 Exmouth Submarine Base, Exmouth, Australia called Potshot
Roebuck Bay Seaplane Base, Western Australia
 Naval Base Adelaide, Australia
 Auxiliary Albany Submarine Base, Port of Albany, Western Australia
Fleet Radio Unit, Melbourne, Australia - intelligence unit
Fremantle submarine base at Perth, Australia
Naval Base Perth, Australia
Thursday Island PT Boat Base on Thursday Island, Australia - Base, PT boat base 
 Palm Island, Queensland, Australia, Naval Air Station
New Guinea:
Naval Base Milne Bay, New Guinea, Major Base
Kana Kopa  PT Boat Base, Milne Bay, New Guinea - PT Boat Base  
Naval Base Port Moresby, Port Moresby, New Guinea, HQ Seventh Fleet 
Ladava Navy Base, Ladava, Milne Bay - Base
Tufi, New Guinea - Advanced Base, PT boat base
Naval Base Lae, Morobe River, Morobe Province, New Guinea - Advanced Base, airfields, PT boat base - Landing at Nadzab
Naval Base Woodlark Island, Woodlark Island, New Guinea  - Advanced Base - 6,500 feet runway
Fergusson Island, New Guinea  - Advanced Base, PT boat base 
Buna, Papua New Guinea - Advanced Base, airfield, PT boat base  (Battle of Buna–Gona)
Rabaul, New Guinea - Bases around city, not in the town 
Kiriwina Airfield, Kiriwina Island, New Guinea - Advanced Base -  6,000 runway 
Dreger Harbor, New Guinea - Advanced Base, PT boat base
Saidor, New Guinea - Advanced Base, PT boat base, Airfiled Saidor Airport
Rein Bay, New Britain - Advanced Base, PT boat base 
Talasea, New Britain - Advanced Base (Battle of Talasea)
Aitape, New Guinea - Advanced base,  PT boat base 
Naval Base Hollandia, New Guinea - Advanced Base, depot, repair base, depot, hospital and HQ Seventh Fleet, In Humboldt Bay and Tanahmerah Bay, Closed 1946.
Naval Base Mios Woendi at Mios Woendi, New Guinea - PT boat base 
Wakde, New Guinea - Advanced Base,  PT boat base
Amsterdam Island, New Guinea - Advanced base - PT boat base
Naval Base Morotai, New Guinea - Advanced Base - PT Boats, seaplane base, depot, repair, sawmill, (Army airstrips), (1944-1946)
Soemsoem Island, New Guinea, PT-boat base, closed 1946
Naval Base Merauke in  Merauke, New Guinea PT Boats and 6,000 feet runway
 Naval Base Finschhafen  New Guinea - PT boats and amphibious craft base, Dreger Airfield - hospital (1944-1945)
 Naval Base Cape Gloucester at Cape Gloucester, New Guinea, port and two runways
 Biak, Mios Woendi and Padaido Lagoon, New Guinea, including Owi Airfield and 2nd runway, during over to Dutch Navy.  Seaplane and PT boat base, ship repair and hospital. (1944-1946)
 Naval Base Alexishafen-Madang, New Guinea, Advance Base, PT Boat, repair, closed 1945
Naval Base Noemfoor, New Guinea 
Naval Base Cape Sansapor, New Guinea

Borneo

(some bases shared with Australian)
Naval Base Morotai
Tarakan - Advanced Base, PT boat base 
Tawi-Tawi - Advanced Base, PT boat base 
Naval Base Brunei Bay at Brunei Bay  - Advanced Base, PT boat base 
Balikpapan - Advanced Base, PT boat base
Naval base Labuan Island to support Timbalai Airfield
Naval Base Timor in East Timor
Naval Base Muara Island after Battle of North Borneo
Naval Base Weston at Weston, Sabah,

Indian Ocean

Naval Base Kandy at Kandy in Ceylon, shared with Briton and India (South East Asia Command
Naval Base Calcutta at Calcutta shared with British and India FPO#918
Naval Base Madras, at Madras India FPO# 918, Box M
Naval Base Rangoon, at Rangoon Burma FPO#918, Box R
Naval Base Durban, South Africa FPO# 911, Box E
Naval Base Mombasa, Kenya Colony, Africa FPO# 911, Box F
Naval Base Capetown, South Africa FPO#911, Box G
Naval Observer Freetown, Sierra Leone, Africa FPO# 62 NY

West Africa
Naval Observer, Freetown, Sierra Leone, Africa FPO# 62 
Casablanca, French Morocco, Africa FPO# 142
Agadir, French Morocco, Africa FPO# 522 
Port Lyautey, French Morocco, Africa FPO# 214, Advanced Amphibious Training Base 
Fedala, French Morocco, Africa FPO#  215 
Safi, French Morocco, Africa FPO# 217 
Algiers, Algeria, Africa FPO# 922 
Algiers, Algieria, Africa FPO# 728, Box 25 
Arzeu, Algeria, Africa FPO# 232, Naval Station and Naval Air Facility 
Oran, Algeria, Africa FPO# 147 
Mers El Kebir, Algeria, Africa FPO# 233 
Nemours, Ghazaouet, Algeria, Africa, FPO# 235, Advanced Amphibious Training Base 
Beni Saf, Algeria, Africa FPO# 236, Advanced Amphibious Training Base   
Mostaganem, Alferia, Africa FPO# 238, Advanced Amphibious Training Base    
Ténès, Algeria, Africa FPO# 239, Advanced Amphibious Training Base  
Cherchel, Algeria, Africa FPO# 240 
Tipaza, Algeria, Africa FPO# 241  
Dakar, French West Africa FPO# 241

Japan and Marianas

seabeemagazine United States naval forces at Hiroshima, Kabayana, Yokosuka, Omura
 Naval Base Okinawa, PT Boat base, seaplane base, hospital, depot, repair depot airfields
Naval Base Iwo Jima on Iwo Jima, 3 captured runways (Naval improved them), hospital Central Field, South Field (Battle of Iwo Jima)*
Chichi Jima Naval Base - Chichijima Airfield (1945-1968)
Ōmura, Nagasaki, Depot, Port HQ, airfield
Kure, Hiroshima, Naval Base, after war turned over to Ishikawajima Shipbuilding & Engineering Company, US Navy used part of the base.
Nagasaki, port for inspection 
Hiroshima, port for inspection 
Yokosuka Naval Base, now JMSDF Yokosuka Naval Base
Sasebo Naval Base, was Sasebo Naval Arsenal now United States Fleet Activities Sasebo
Naval Base Tateyama, post-war now JMSDF Tateyama Air Base

New Zealand

 Auckland, New Zealand, Naval Base (1944-1945)
US Navy Magazines, Motutapu Island
US Navy Magazines, Kauri Point Armament Depot
Fuel Tank Farm, Northcote, Auckland
Avondale Naval Hospital, Avondale, Auckland
Sylvia Park Stores, Mount Wellington, Auckland
Mangere Crossing Stores, Mangere, Auckland
Halsey Street Store, Wynyard Quarter, Auckland
Hilldene, Papakura, Auckland
Little Riverina, Wilsons Road, Warkworth
Tamaki Stores, Glen Innes, Auckland
Silverstream Naval Hospital, Upper Hutt
Trentham Racecourse Hospital, Trentham, Upper Hutt
Kaiwharawhara Park, Kaiwharawhara, Wellington
Hutt Park, Lower Hutt
Judgeford Valley, Haywards Road, Paremata 
Pakiri Beach Camp 
Whangateau Hall & Reserve
Paekakariki,  Camp Paekakariki, Camp Russell, Camp McKay camp 
Auckland outlining camps
Wellington outlining camps

China
Tientsin Operation Beleaguer, airfield FPO#3934
Shanghai  Naval Advance Base (1946-1947) FPO#3930
Peiping  Port (Beijing) 
Tsingtao port (1946-1949) FPO#3913
Chungking FPO#169
Changting FPO#180 
Kunming FPO# 930 NY 
Hong Kong FPO# 969 
 Tungao port FPO#3019
 Hinghwa FPO#3020
 Ningpo Peninsula FPO# 3022
 Amoy FPO#3087
 Chusan Archipelago FPO#3177
 Tinghai Harbor, Chusan Island FPO#3190
 Taohwa Shan FPO#3274
 Lu Wang FPO#3275
 Wenchow FPO#3910
 Chingwangtao FPO#3932
 Chefoo FPO#3940
 Naval Air Base Kwangchow

Mediterranean

Bone, Algeria - Advanced Base, PT Boat base (Battle of Algiers)
Bizerte, Tunisia - Base, PT Boat base, Advanced Amphibious Training Base
Tunis, Tunisia -  Advanced Amphibious Training Base
Palermo, Sicily - Advanced Base, PT Boat base
Capri, Italy - Advanced Base, PT Boat base
Gela, Italy - Advanced Base
Salerno, Italy, port 
Anzio, Italy, port
Nettuno, port
Côte d'Azur, port
La Maddalena, Sardinia - Advanced Base, PT Boat base
Bastia, Corsica, - Advanced Base, PT Boat base
Calvi, Corsica - Advanced Base, PT Boat base
Sainte-Maxime, France - Advanced Base, PT Boat base
Golfe-Juan, France - Advanced Base, PT Boat base
Leghorn, Italy - Advanced Base, PT Boat base
 Naval Air Station Port Lyautey, Morocco Operation Torch, port
Safi, Morocco (Operation Blackstone), port
Fedala, Morocco (Operation Brushwood, port
Port Lyautey, Morocco Operation Goalpost, port
Oran, Algeria, port
Bizerte, Tunis, Tunisia Campaign, port, deot
Casablanca, port, depot
 Marathon, Greece base, (1962-?)
 Cephalonia, Greece earthquake relief base (1953)

Atlantic

 Port of Antwerp, Belgium, Port shared with Britain, 1944-1946
Cherbourg, France - Advanced Base, PT Boat base
Naval Base La Havre France - Advanced Base 
Port of Le Havre, France - Advanced Base 
Ostend, Belgium, port
Hengelo, Holland port
Vreden, Germany, port
Frankfurt-am-Main, Germany, port
Bremerhaven, Germany, port
Rosneath naval base, Scotland 
 Londonderry Port, Northern Ireland, Naval Base, hospital
Milford Haven and other ports, Wales, Normandy staging ports, hospital
 Penarth, Wales, amphibious port
Bluie West One, Greenland, seaplane base. 
Naval Air Station Keflavik, Iceland
Seaplane Base Reykjavik, Iceland
 Naval Operating Base Iceland
 Holy Loch Missile base, (1961-?)
England
 East Anglia Normandy staging ports
Exeter, Devon,  Naval Base, HQ, large depot, closed 1944
Cornwall, Naval Base
Dartmouth, England - Advanced Base, PT Boat base 
Isle of Portland - Main Base, PT Boat base 
Heathfield, Devon, large depot 
Netley Large hospital
Lough Erne, port
 Loch Ryan, port
Falmouth, Cornwall, amphibious port, hospital
Fowey, England amphibious port
Plymouth, amphibious port, housing camps
Salcombe, amphibious port
Dartmouth, Devon, amphibious port
Teignmouth, amphibious port
St. Mawes, small amphibious port 
Saltash, small amphibious port 
Calstock, small amphibious port 
Weymouth, Dorset, small amphibious port 
Poole, small amphibious port 
Southampton, small amphibious port 
Instow, small amphibious port
Scapa Flow large naval base (British shared)
Naval Advanced Amphibious Base Southhampton (May 1944-1945)
Naval Advance Amphibious Base Deptford
Advanced Amphibious Training Base Appledore,

Caribbean and South America

 Panama Canal
Coco Solo,  Naval air station for patrol planes and a submarine base 
 Balboa, Panama, Balboa Naval station, depot, submarines, destroyers and patrol boats
Taboga Island, Panama Canal - Advance base, PT Boats, Training Base, closed in 1946
Almirante, Bocas del Toro, Panama,  PT-boat
Mandinga, Panama, lighter-than-air base, three 3,000-foot runways
La Chorrera, Panama, Panama,  emergency fighter-plane base, lighter-than-air pad
Mandiga, Panama, base
 Gatún, Panama, radio station
Arraijan,  Panama, tank farm
 Cristóbal, Colón, Panama, dry dock, repair depot
Isla Grande in Port of San Juan, Puerto Rico, Naval air station, repair depot, 5400-foot runway and 2300-foot runway
 San Juan, Puerto Rico, Air Station on Isla Grande, hospital, seaplane base, depot, San Patricio, Catano.
 Roosevelt Roads Naval Station, at Ensenada Honda, Vieques Island, Puerto Rico, drydock, 3 6,000-foot runways, depot, a major port.
 Culebra Island, Puerto Rico,  one 2,400-foot runway
St. Lucia, Gros Islet Bay, Puerto Rico, Advance base, airbase, seaplane base
Antigua, Puerto Rico, base
Naval Air Station Crabbs at Crabbs Peninsula, Antigua 
Naval seaplane base Exuma, on Exuma Island at George Town, Bahamas
United States Naval Facility, Barbados (closed 1979)
Great Exuma, naval air station, seaplane base
Antilles, base
Corinto, Nicaragua, Naval Base and Naval Auxiliary Air Facility
Salinas, Ecuador, base
 St. Thomas, Virgin Islands, Bourne Field, Lindbergh Bay for seaplanes and submarine base Gregerie Channel, seaplane base
Naval Station Argentia
Morgan and Tucker Islands, in Great Sound, Bermuda, support carrier and patrol aircraft, seaplanes, cruiser, destroyer, and submarine base, depot, anti-aircraft training school (Plus Hamilton Island at Kings Point,) Naval Air Station Bermuda Annex
Darrell's Island, Bermuda, Bermuda, seaplane base
 Ordnance Island, Bermuda, submarine base
 Riddle's Bay, Bermuda, recreational center
Great Exuma, Little Goat Island, Port Royal, Jamaica, seaplane base
Antigua, Jamaica, airbase, seaplane base
Galapagos Islands, Ecuador, Seaplane Base at Aeolian Cove, Airfield, hospital.
Salinas, Ecuador,  patrol plane, seaplane and patrol boat base, closed 1946
Puerto Castillo, Honduras
 Barranquilla, Colombia, naval air base, and lighter-than-air base,  repair shop, also used Soledad International Airport, closed 1945.
Gulf of Paria, Trinidad, (Carenage Bay, Chaguaramus Bay, Teteron Bay, and Scotland Bay. Chaguaramus Valley and Tucker Valley) Air Station, training and Advance base, fleet base, hospital, depot, ship repair
British Guiana, Advance base, seaplane base, Lighter-than-air base, (Atkinson Field)
Georgetown, British Guiana FPO#12
 Paramaribo, Dutch Guiana, now Suriname, FPO#404 
Amapá, Brazil, naval air base, lighter-than-air base, closed 1945
 Maceió, Brazil, lighter-than-air base, closed 1945
Belem, Brazil, seaplane base, naval air base, closed 1945
 Igarape Assu, Brazil, lighter-than-air base, naval air base, closed 1945
São Luís, Maranhão, Brazil, lighter-than-air base, naval air base, closed 1945
Camocim, Brazil, seaplane base, closed 1945
 Santo Amaro do Ipitanga Airport Brazil, lighter-than-air base, naval air base, closed 1945
Fortaleza, Brazil, lighter-than-air base, naval air base, closed 1945
Fernando de Noronha, Brazil, naval air base, closed 1945
Natal, Rio Grande do Norte, Brazil, Parnamirim Field, naval air base, closed 1945
Recife, Brazil, Ibura Field, Knox Hospital, depot
Maceio, Brazil,  lighter-than-air base, naval air base, closed 1945
Santo Amaro do Ipitanga Airport, Brazil, lighter-than-air base, naval air base, closed 1945
Bahia, Brazil, Aratu seaplane base, ship-repair base, closed 1945
Caravellas, Brazil,  lighter-than-air base, naval air base, closed 1945
 Vitória, Espírito Santo, Brazil, Victoria Airport, closed 1945
Santa Cruz, Rio de Janeiro, Brazil, naval air base, closed 1945
 Laguna del Sauce, Uruguay, seaplane base, closed 1945 
Salinas, Ecuador,  naval air base, hospital.
Barranquilla, Colombia, lighter-than-air base, naval air base, closed 1945
Curaçao, Netherlands West Indies, Camp Parera, Hato Field closed 1945
Puerto Castilla, Honduras, seaplane base, depot
Gulf of Fonseca, Nicaragua, Advance base moved to Corinto 1943 
 Corinto, Nicaragua, Advance base, Seaplanes and PT boat base, naval auxiliary air patrol bombers, fleet depot. Closed in 1946
Aruba Small naval force to defnened oil field, closed in 1945
Paramaribo, Suriname,  lighter-than-air station (Also Zandry Field)
 Suriname, lighter-than-air base,  naval air base, closed 1945
 Naval Base Grand Cayman, British West Indies
Lima, Peru FPO#121, Box L 
Santiago, Chile FPO#121, Box S  FPO# 153, Box F 
Valparaiso, Chile FPO#121, Box S

Aleutian Islands

Naval Air Facility Adak
Naval Base Dutch Harbor, Unalaska,  Naval Base, submarine base, PT boat base (Battle of Dutch Harbor)
Finger Bay, Adak Island - Base, airfield, PT boat base, hospital, seaplane base Andrew Lagoon, port at Sweeper Cove, recreational center
Naval Air Station Kodiak 
Amchitka - Advanced Base,  Three airstrips, PT boat base 
Naval Air Station Attu Casco Cove, Attu - Base, airfield, PT boat base 
 Kiska, Recreational facilities, seaplanes base, depot
 Massacre Bay, airfield, Seaplane base, depot
 Sitka Naval Operating Base and U.S. Army Coastal Defenses, Sitka, seaplane base, hospital 
 Annette Island
 Chichagof Island Port Althorp
 Shemya, auxiliary air facility 
 Port Armstrong on Baranof Island, closed 1943 
 Yakutat Bay airfield, Seaplane base
 Cordova, Alaska Cordova Bay,  naval section base, Naval gun emplacement
 Kodiak Island Submarine Base 
Tongass Narrows,  naval section base 
 Tongatapu  Advanced Base, (1942-1945)
 Womens Bay, seaplane base, depot, repair, Submarine services, hospital
Woody Island, Submarine base
Chernabura, Naval outlying station
Sand Point, Naval outlying station, auxiliary air facility, depot
 Cold Bay, Naval outlying station, naval auxiliary air facility
King Cove, Naval outlying station, dry dock, depot
Chirikof Island, Naval outlying station
Chiniak, Naval outlying station
Entrance Point, Naval outlying station, on Sandy Cove on Little Koniuji Island of the Shumagin Islands
Cape Greville, Naval outlying station on Kodiak Island
Sanak Island, Naval outlying station
Afognak, Naval outlying station
 Atka Island,  airfield
 Tanaga Island,  airfield 
 Point Barrow,  airfield, depot, dog sleds
 (Ogliuga Island Ogliuga Island Army Airfield  built by Navy)
 (Fort Greely and Fort Randall Army bases, built by Navy)
Borabora Island, Society Islands, French Polynesia, - Advanced Base (1942-1946)
 Wallis Island, - Advanced Base  (1944-1945)
  Alaska earthquake relief base (1964)
Naval Base Ketchikan now Coast Guard Base Ketchikan

Korea
For Korean War built:
 Inchon, South Korea, Advance Base (1951-1954) Battle of Inchon (Jinsen) FPO#964Seabees report Inchon
 Pusan, South Korea, landing, (1950-1954) (Battle of Pusan Perimeter) FPO#966
 Wonsan, landing (1950), Yo-Do airfield (Blockade of Wonsan)
 Kimbo (1950)
 Taegu, Battle of Taegu (1950)
 Seabees built the airfields used by Marine and Airforce. 
Seishin, Korea FPO#965

Antarctica
 McMurdo Sound, Operation Deep Freeze, research base (1955–1956)

Vietnam
For Vietnam War:
 Naval Support Activity Danang, Da Nang Air Base
 Chu Lai Base Area, Chu Lai Advance Base
 Đông Hà airfield
 Cam Ranh Bay

World War I
During World War I the Navy had overseas bases, they were not called Advance Bases.
U.S. Naval Air Station Wexford Ireland
U.S. Naval Air Station Queenstown Ireland
 Bordeaux, France Seabase
 Brest, France, Seabase
 Berehaven, Ireland, Seabase
 Bantry Bay,  Ireland, Seabase
 Azores, Portugal, sub base
 Leith, Scotland, Hospital

Gallery

See alsoThe Fighting Seabees''
Army Transport Service
 Naval Mobile Construction Battalion 25
 Combat engineer
 Underwater Demolition Team
 List of United States Navy shore activities during World War II
 List of naval and land-based operations in the Pacific Theater during World War II
 United States Army Air Forces in the South Pacific Area
 Carrier Aircraft Service Units

References

External links
 WWII BATTLEGROUND The Fighting Navy Seabees video
 U.S. NAVY WWII COLOR FILM ADVANCE BASE SEABEES Construction Batallions video
 NAVAL ADVANCE BASE SUPPLY ACTIVITIES, MARSHALL ISLAND video
 Pearl Harbor Official website
 Guam Official website
 seabeesmuseum.com

Naval Stations of the United States Navy
World War II airfields in the Pacific Ocean Theater
Airfields of the United States Navy
Military installations closed in the 1940s
United States Navy
Seabees
Seabee units and formations
Military engineering of the United States